Podstrana is a municipality and settlement in Croatia in the Split-Dalmatia County. It has a population of 9,129 (2011 census), 97% which are Croats.

In the Second World War, the town suffered 131 casualties.

Podstrana experiences a hot-summer Mediterranean climate (Köppen climate classification Csa) with extremely long periods of sunshine throughout the year.

Snow is unknown.

Spring and fall (autumn) are considered ideal seasons for sightseeing and various outdoor activities.

Summers are very hot during the day, and hot in the summer nights.

The settlement is housed in a fairly rural landscape considering its proximity to the nearby city of Split (c. 8 km away). Peach growing has been replaced by tourism which is now the dominant sector for the population. Le Méridien Lav, a five-star hotel is located within the municipality of Podstrana. The hotel has a live web cam with a panoramic view of Stobreč and Split.

See also
 Lucius Artorius Castus

References

Populated places in Split-Dalmatia County
Municipalities of Croatia
Populated coastal places in Croatia